Conrad Hubbard is best known as a web designer and author for White Wolf, Inc.

Author credits

Published material by Conrad Hubbard consists of contributions to more than 35 books which are classified as roleplaying game books, published by White Wolf Publishing and Sword & Sorcery Studios.

Books which Conrad Hubbard has contributed to include:

World of Darkness titles 

 Mokole (a Changing Breed book)
 Sorcerer: Revised Edition
 Mummy: The Resurrection
 Mage Storytellers Handbook
 Mummy Players Guide
 Laws of the Resurrection
 The Fallen Tower: Las Vegas
 Vampire Players Guide
 The Red Sign
 Ascension
 Second Sight
 Promethean: The Created

d20 System titles 

 Relics & Rituals
 Creature Collection 2: Dark Menagerie
 The Wise and the Wicked
 The Divine and the Defeated
 Scarred Lands Campaign Setting: Ghelspad
 Secrets and Societies
 Scarred Lands Campaign Setting: Termana
 Strange Lands: Lost Tribes of the Scarred Lands

Exalted titles 

 Creatures of the Wyld
 The Tomb of 5 Corners (free download at White Wolf's website)
 Exalted Second Edition
 Manual of Exalted Power: Dragon-Blooded
 Manual of Exalted Power: Lunars
 Book of Sorcery, vol.3: Oadenol's Codex
 Compass of Terrestrial Directions, vol.2: The West
 Manual of Exalted Power: Sidereals

Trinity Universe titles 

 Hidden Agendas
 Trinity Technology Manual
 Trinity Battleground
 Trinity Battleground Players Guide (unpublished release downloadable from White Wolf's site)

Concept and design credits

Books which Conrad Hubbard has helped with concept and design include: 
 The World of Darkness core rulebook
 Vampire: The Requiem
 Werewolf: The Forsaken
 Mage: The Awakening
 Promethean: The Created
 Changeling: The Lost

Web design

As a web designer for White Wolf, Conrad Hubbard led the production of a text-based online chat based role-playing game set in the World of Darkness, fictional New Bremen, Georgia. The New Bremen chat used off the shelf software called Digichat (a product of Digi-Net Technologies, Inc.), supplemented with a database that stored characters and the Storytellers approvals thereof and notes pertaining to them.

Over the years after the introduction of New Bremen, White Wolf opened multiple roleplaying game chat settings using a similar model.

The roster of moderated White Wolf RPG Chat settings included:

 New Bremen (for a mixed classic World of Darkness venue)
 World of Darkness: Chicago (for a mixed new World of Darkness venue)
 City of the Damned: New Orleans (for Vampire: The Requiem)
 Hunting Grounds: The Rockies (for Werewolf: The Forsaken)
 Boston Unveiled (for Mage: The Awakening)
 Nexus (mixed venue Exalted Second Edition)
 The Blessed Isle (Dragon-Blooded Exalted Second Edition chronicle)
 Fangsfall (for d20 System Scarred Lands)
 Jade City (mixed venue Exalted First Edition)
 Dark Ages Bremen (Dark Ages games)
 Rookhausen (for d20 System Ravenloft)
 Trinity Universe

Additionally, White Wolf hosted unmoderated chat room areas, where people could join to run their own roleplaying games using the same software and database design as the moderated rooms.

References

Wikipedia references

List of Exalted sourcebooks

External links
ConradHubbard.com - Conrad Hubbard's Official Site

Role-playing game designers
Role-playing game writers
White Wolf game designers
Year of birth missing (living people)
Living people